Moisei Yakovlevich Ginzburg (Minsk – 7 January 1946, Moscow) was a Soviet constructivist architect, best known for his 1929 Narkomfin Building in Moscow.

Biography

Education
Ginzburg was born in Minsk into a Jewish architect's family. He graduated from Milano Academy (1914) and Riga Polytechnical Institute (1917). During Russian Civil War he lived in the Crimea, relocating to Moscow in 1921. There, he joined the faculty of VKhUTEMAS and the Institute of Civil Engineers (which eventually merged with Moscow State Technical University).

Ideologist of Constructivism

The founder of the OSA Group (Organisation of Contemporary Architects), which had links with Vladimir Mayakovsky and Osip Brik's LEF Group, he published the book Style and Epoch in 1924, an influential work of architectural theory with similarities to Le Corbusier's Vers une architecture. It was effectively the manifesto of Constructivist Architecture, a style which combined an interest in advanced technology and engineering with socialist ideals. The OSA experimented with forms of Communal apartments to provide for the new Communist way of life. Its magazine SA (Sovremennaya Arkhitektura, or Contemporary Architecture) featured discussions of city planning and communal living, as well as the futuristic projects of Ivan Leonidov. The group was dissolved in the early 1930s into an 'All-Union Association of Architects', along with the competing Modernist group ASNOVA, led by Nikolai Ladovsky, and the proto-Stalinist VOPRA.

Communal houses

The first of these was the Gosstrakh apartments (Malaya Bronnaya Street, Moscow), designed in 1926, one of which was rented by Sergei Tretyakov: these flats were the first employment of Le Corbusier's 'Five Points of Modern Architecture' in the USSR. A similar structure was built to Ginzburg's 1928 design in Sverdlovsk (21, Malysheva Street, completed 1932).

This was followed three years later by the Narkomfin Building, a 'social condenser' which tried to embody socialist and principles in its structure. The apartment blocks were built for employees of the Commissariat of Finance (or 'Narkomfin'), and featured collective facilities, roof gardens and a parkland setting. The Narkomfin building was acknowledged by Le Corbusier as an influence on his Unité d'Habitation, while the layout of its duplex apartments have been copied by Moshe Safdie in his Expo 67 flats, as well as by Denys Lasdun in his luxury flats at St James', London.

In 1928, Ginzburg also designed the Government Building in Alma-Ata (now, University of Alma-Ata), completed in 1931. In the early 1930s, he concentrated more on urban planning projects, from utilitarian (Ufa city plan) to utopian ("Green City" contest entry, for a large residential area on the outskirts of Moscow). He was also a Soviet delegate to the CIAM from 1928 to 1932.

Career in 1930s

Like other avant-garde artists with limited practical experience, Ginzburg fell out of favor in 1932, when the state took control of architectural profession and steered it in favor of eclectic, revivalist stalinist architecture. Actual demotion of Ginzburg and other constructivists became a gradual process that extended until the end of the 1930s. He never returned to Moscow or Leningrad practice, but left a contribution in Crimea and Central Asia and retained his own architectural workshop until his death. His new books on Home (Жилище) and Industrializing housing construction (Индустриализация жилищного строительства) were printed in 1934 and 1937; since 1934, Ginzburg was the editor of an encyclopedic History of Architecture.

In the early 1930s, Ginzburg was involved in planning of Crimean Coast, designed a number of resort hotels and sanatoriums; only one of them was built in Kislovodsk (1935-1937). Ginzburg's workshop was also employed by the Ministry of Railways and designed a whole range of model stations for Central Asian and Siberian railroads. Their projects, publicized in the late 1930s, are not as bold as the 1920s avant-garde but are definitely modernist in appearance.

In the 1940s, Ginzburg produced the reconstruction plan for post-war Sevastopol (never materialized) and designed two resort buildings that were completed in Kislovodsk and Oreanda after his death.

Legacy

His most famous work, the Narkomfin Building, having been without maintenance for decades, was on UNESCO's endangered buildings list. Previous proposals to rebuild Dom Narkomfin into a hotel (designed by Ginzburg's grandson) were barred by legal uncertainty over the status of the site. As of 2019, Dom Narkomfin was under careful restoration to become once again a private residential complex. The goal was to restore the building as close to its original state as possible; restoration was completed in 2020.

Narkomfin has been the subject of Victor Buchli's study of Soviet material culture, Archaeology of Socialism (Berg, 2000), which traces the building's history from early Utopianism to the harshness of the Stalinist era, up to its ruined state in the 1990s.

See also
Constructivist architecture
Le Corbusier
Joseph Karakis
El Lissitzky
Konstantin Melnikov
Hannes Meyer
Vladimir Tatlin
Bruno Taut
Alexander Vesnin

References

Sources
 Berkovich, Gary. Reclaiming a History. Jewish Architects in Imperial Russia and the USSR. Volume 2. Soviet Avant-garde: 1917–1933. Weimar und Rostock: Grunberg Verlag. 2021. P. 15. 
 Ginés Garrido: Moisei Gínzburg. Escritos 1923-1930. Madrid: El Croquis editorial 2007 
 Russian: Ginzburg's railroad designs - И.Г.Явейн, "Проектирование железнодорожных вокзалов", М, 1938
 Historia de la Arquitectura Moderna, Leonardo Benévolo, Editorial Gustavo Gili, S.A., 1996 
 Ciudad rusa y ciudad soviética, Vieri Quilici, Editorial Gustavo Gili, S.A., 1978 
 Regional and City Planning in the Soviet Union, H. Blumenfeld, 1942
 La Montaña Mágica, Thomas Mann

External links

Campaign for the Preservation of the Narkomfin Building
The Art Newspaper on the Narkomfin
Photographs of Kislovodsk Sanatorium designed by Ginzburg (with later alterations)

Russian avant-garde
Soviet architects
Constructivist architects
Modernist architects
Soviet non-fiction writers
Soviet male writers
20th-century male writers
Soviet Jews
Jewish architects
Russian architects
Congrès International d'Architecture Moderne members
Riga Technical University alumni
Academic staff of Vkhutemas
Belarusian Jews
People from Minsk
1892 births
1946 deaths
Modernist architecture in Russia
20th-century non-fiction writers
Male non-fiction writers